John Stewart King (born 13 February 1963 in Chatham, Kent) is a male retired English athlete.

Athletics career
King competed in the men's long jump event during his career. He represented Great Britain at the 1988 Summer Olympics in Seoul, South Korea, finishing 23rd place. King was affiliated with Wolverhampton Wanderers & Bilston Athletic Club during his days.

He represented England in the long jump event, at the 1986 Commonwealth Games in Edinburgh, Scotland. Four years later he represented England, at the 1990 Commonwealth Games in Auckland, New Zealand.

References 

1963 births
Living people
Sportspeople from Chatham, Kent
English male long jumpers
Olympic athletes of Great Britain
Athletes (track and field) at the 1988 Summer Olympics
Athletes (track and field) at the 1990 Commonwealth Games
Commonwealth Games competitors for England